Dirk Beheydt (born 17 October 1951) is a Belgian former professional footballer who played as a forward.

Beheydt was discovered by Cercle Brugge while he was playing for then lower league side Winkel Sport. Even though there was a big level gap between the two teams, Beheydt had no trouble adjusting to the highest level of Belgian football. He scored on his debut against AS Oostende. This was also the first match for Cercle in their new stadium. Cercle lost the match 2–1.

Beheydt achieved quite some personal highlights with Cercle:
 3rd most goals in the history of Cercle (only Pertry and Weber do better)
 Top league goal scorer of the team (1976, 1977, 1979, 1980, 1983)
 Player of the Year (1976, 1977)

Dirk Beheydt was also capped once for Belgium. He played in an away game against Italy on 26 January 1977. Belgium lost the match 2-1.

References

External links
 Cerclemuseum.be 
 

1951 births
Living people
People from Izegem
Belgian footballers
Association football forwards
Belgium international footballers
Cercle Brugge K.S.V. players
Belgian Pro League players
K.R.C. Zuid-West-Vlaanderen players
Sint-Eloois-Winkel Sport players
Footballers from West Flanders